One Piece is a Japanese manga series written and illustrated by Eiichiro Oda that has been translated into various languages and spawned a substantial media franchise. It follows the adventures of the seventeen-year-old boy Monkey D. Luffy, whose body gained the properties of rubber when he accidentally ate a supernatural fruit, as he travels the oceans in search of the series' eponymous treasure and organizes a diverse crew of pirates, named the Straw Hats. In Japan, the series is published by Shueisha – chapterwise in the shōnen manga anthology Weekly Shōnen Jump since July 22, 1997 and in tankōbon (collected volumes making up from about 10 to 12 chapters) format since December 24, 1997.

In North America, Viz Media currently serializes One Piece in its digital anthology magazine Weekly Shonen Jump simultaneously with Japan. It originally published its English language adaptation of the series in the now-defunct print anthology Shonen Jump since the magazine's launch in November 2002. It publishes tankōbon format since June 2003, and also publishes them digitally through [vizmanga.com]. In the United Kingdom, the tankōbon were published by Gollancz Manga, starting March 2006, until Viz Media took over after the fourteenth volume. In Australia and New Zealand, the English volumes are distributed by Madman Entertainment since November 10, 2008.


Volume list

Lists of main series chapters
 List of One Piece chapters 1 to 186
 List of One Piece chapters 187 to 388
 List of One Piece chapters 389 to 594
 List of One Piece chapters 807 to 1015
 List of One Piece chapters 1016 to now

See also
 List of One Piece media

References

Chapter 4